This list of schools located in Afghanistan includes the country's primary and secondary schools. According to the Afghan Ministry of Education, there are approximately 18,000 schools across Afghanistan. Afghanistan's tertiary schools are listed on a separate sub-list at List of universities in Afghanistan. The list is organized alphabetically by province and within a province, alphabetically by school name.

Badakhshan Province
 Ahli Mughulha High School (Central Asia Institute supported)

Balkh Province

 Afghan-Turk High School in Mazar-e-Sharif (private)

Herat Province

 Afghan-Turk High School (private)

Jowzjan Province
 Afghan-Turk High School in Sheberghan (private)
 Habibe Kadiri High School, Aqcha (girls) (Republic of Turkey – Ministry of National Education)

Kabul Province

 Abul Qasem e Ferdowsi High School (girls)
 Khwaja Abdullah Ansari
 Abdul Qadir Shahid High School 
 Afghan-Turk High School (private)
 Afghanistan National Institute of Music
 Afghanistan Relief Organization Technology Education Center (TEC) (co-educational)
 Afghanistan Technical Vocational Institute (co-educational)
 Afghanistan National School (private)
 Ahmad Shah Baba High School (boys)
 Ahmad Shah Massoud High School
 Aisha-i-Durani School (girls) (a.k.a. Durani High School or Mädchengymnasium Aysha-e Durani)
 Amani High School (aka Amani–Oberrealschule)
 Afghan Yaar High School (private)
 Ashaqan Arefan School
 Al Fattha High School (girls)
 Aryob Public School (APS)
 Central Asia English School / Computer Center (Central Asia Institute supported) 
 Deh Dana Girls' High School (girls)
 Esteqlal High School
 Familia (Reshkhur) High School (SESP) (Central Asia Institute supported) 
 Ghazi High School
 Ghulam Haider Khan High School (boys)
 Erfan Private School
 Habibia High School (boys)
 Hope High School (Afghanistan)
 Abdul Hadi Dawi High School (boys)
 Payam Private High School
 International School of Kabul (ISK) (co-educational)
 Lalander Primary School (Shahid Motahidi) (Central Asia Institute supported) 
 Kabul Al-fath School 
 Kuchi Primary Tent School (Nomad Mobile School) (Central Asia Institute supported)
 Kamiri Girls High School (Central Asia Institute supported)
 Khushal Khan High School 
 Kaseer-ul-Estifada High School 
 Hazrat Ibrahim Khalilullah High School 
 Lamia Shaheed High School (girls)
 Lycée Esteqlal
 Lycée Malalaï
 Marefat High School (co-educational) – one of the best schools in Kabul Afghanistan; has achieved the first position among private and public schools in Kabul 
 Mir Afghan Girls School (Central Asia Institute supported) 
 Mohammad Tarzi High School (boys)
 Mohammad Alam Faiz Zad High School (boys and girls) – located in the area between Kolola Pushta and Shahrara in a great area of Shar-E Naw, behind Ali Abad Hospital (formerly Malalay Zezhantoon). The previous name of this High School was Lycées Tajrobawe Etibar Khan. The name changed at the first presidency of Burhanuddin Rabani. Later on, the primary and secondary schools of Manochehre which was also located on the other side of Kolola Pushta, adjacent to Austria embassy has been merged to Mohammad Alam Faizzad High School. Mohammad Alam Faizzad High School is a well known public school its graduates are studying in different local and foreign universities and the graduates are working in different intermediate and higher levels of designations in the private and public sectors.
 Malalai High School (girls)
 Malika Suraya High School (girls)
 Mehrabodin High School (co-educational)
 Mustaqbal Private High School (Private)
 Naswan Wahdat High School (girls)
 Navi Bakhtar High School (private)
 Nazo Ana High School (girls)
 Qurtuba High School (co-educational) – in the Karte-Naw neighborhood
 Raba-e-Balkhi High School (girls)
 Rahman Baba High School (boys)
 Rahman Mena Girls High School (Central Asia Institute supported) 
 Sar Asyab Girls High School (girls)
 Shah Shaheed School (girls)
 Sooria high School (girls)
 Sultana Razia School (girls)
 Zarghona High School (girls)
 Saidal Nasery High School (boys)
 Saidal Nasery High School (girls)
 Abdulali Mustaghni High School (boys) in karte se

Kandahar Province 

 Afghan-Turk High School (private)
 Ahmad Shah Baba High School
 Faizal E. Kandahari High School
 Malalai High School (girls)
 Mirwais Nika High School
 Mowlana Jalaladin High School
 Safia Ama Jan Girls High School
 Sardar Mohammed Daoud Khan High School
 Shah Hussain Hotak High School
 Shahid Khakrizwal Girls High School
 Zahir Shah High School
 Zarghona Ana High School (girls)

Panjshir Province
 Bibi Amina Girls High School
 Dowab Primary School (Central Asia Institute supported) 
 Pushgar Girls Primary School (Central Asia Institute supported)

Samangan Province
 Afghan-Turk High School (private)
 Aibak High School
 Aynacha High School
 Ajani Malika High School (girls)
 Experimental High School of Samangan (Lycee Tajrubawi Aibak)

Takhar Province
 Shah Ahmad Masood Schools (3) (previously Central Asia Institute supported)

Zabul Province

 Bibi Khala School in Qalat, Zabul Province (boys and girls)

See also

 Education in Afghanistan
 Lists of schools

References

External links

Wardak seeks $3b in aid for school buildings (Pajhwok Afghan News, May 18, 2013).

Schools
Schools
Schools
Afghanistan
Afghanistan